This is the discography of the British electronic music group N-Trance. The band has released two studio albums, one compilation album and seventeen singles. After originally being signed by 380 Records (part of PWL) for a year, they signed to the independent dance record label All Around the World (AATW) in 1992. Most of their work is released by AATW in the United Kingdom, but they have also been released in Europe, the United States and the rest of the world.

Albums

Studio albums

Compilations
 The Best of N-Trance 1992–2002 (2001)

Singles

Music videos

See also
N-Trance
Freeloaders (band)

References

External links
Discogs.com
Swisscharts.com
Acharts.us
Webcitation.org
Danceartistinfo.com

Freeloaders.co.uk

Discographies of British artists